Sonanza Ensemble is a Swedish ensemble focused on contemporary music. Jan Risberg is the conductor and leader.

Musicians

Anna Lindal, violin I
Josef Cabrales Alin, violin II
Elsbeth Berg, viola
Ewa Rydström, cello
Mikael Karlsson, double bass
Mats Widlund, piano
Ann-Sofi Klingberg, piano
Peter Rydström, flute
Mats Wallin, clarinet
Joakim Anterot, percussion
Jan Risberg, conductor

Repertoire (selection)

Arnold Schönberg - Pierrot Lunaire, Op. 21
Per Nørgård, Prelude to breaking
Anders Eliasson, Senza Risposte, Fogliame
Arne Mellnäs, Gardens
Magnus Lindberg, ...de Tartuffe, je crois... , Ur
Anders Nilsson, Reflections I-III, Divertimento
George Crumb, Eleven Echoes of Autumn
Daniel Börtz, Ett porträtt
Henrik Strindberg, Cheap Thrills
Per Mårtensson, a postcard signed G.B.
Mikael Edlund, the lost Jugglery
Lars Ekström, Garden of Ice
Đuro Živković, Le cimitière marin, Around the candle lights, Eclat de larme
Pär Frid, Déja vú, over and over again
Benjamin Staern, Nattens djupa violoncell

Discography

 Contemporary Nordic Chamber Music (ACCD 1010, 1988)
 Sonanza (CAP 21382, 1991)
 Sonanza (CAP 21450, 1995)
 Unheard of - Again (PSCD 180, 2008)

Participating on composer portrait cd

 Arne Mellnäs (Nocturnes) (PSCD 22, 1985)
 Thomas Jennefelt: Dichterliebe (Musik till en katedralbyggare) (PSCD 68, 1993)
 Folke Rabe: Basta (Notturno) (PSCD 67, 1994)
 Lars Ekström: The Dream Age (Garden of Ice) (PSCD 122, 2001)
 Henrik Strindberg: Within Trees (Cheap Thrills) (PSCD 124, 2004)
 Peter Lindroth: Boxed Chamber (Grusmusikväska) (Nosag CD 146, 2007)

External links
Sonanza Online

Swedish musical groups
Contemporary classical music ensembles
Contemporary classical music in Sweden